Bent Propeller (also known as World Trade Center Stabile) was a red stainless steel sculpture by Alexander Calder.

Description
The main elements of the sculpture were three sheets of curved metal, linked together to form a static work resting under its own weight, making it what Calder called a "stabile", as opposed to his famous "mobile" sculptures. It was reminiscent of a ship's propeller. Like many of Calder's public sculptures, it was painted red. It was moved in 1970 to a plaza in front of 7 World Trade Center, on the northeast corner of the Austin J. Tobin Plaza by Vesey Street and Church Street.

History
The sculpture was commissioned by the Port Authority of New York and New Jersey in 1969 and installed in 1970 at the World Trade Center in New York City.   

The work was destroyed in 2001 in the aftermath of the September 11 attacks, crushed under thousands of tons of rubble when 7 World Trade Center collapsed. About 40 percent of the sculpture was recovered from the debris in the following months. With not enough of the original remaining for a restoration, the recovered elements were stored by the Calder Foundation. Today, a portion of the sculpture can be found at the National September 11 Memorial & Museum.

See also
Sky Gate, New York

References
 Lost Art: Alexander Calder, Tate Gallery, 10 September 2012 
 Found Art: Parts of Calder Sculpture Retrieved from Trade Center, NPR, 22 October 2001
 Alexander Calder, 1898-1976, Bent Propeller, 1970, Gallery of Lost Art
 Alexander Calder, Gallery of Lost Art blog, 16 November 2012
 Bent Propeller, Gallery of Lost Art blog, 2 May 2012

 Sculpture Fragment, Recovered, National September 11 Memorial & Museum, 2011

1970 establishments in New York (state)
1970 sculptures
2001 disestablishments in New York (state)
Artworks in the World Trade Center

Destroyed sculptures
Sculptures by Alexander Calder
Stainless steel sculptures in the United States